ISO character set may primarily refer to:

 ISO/IEC 646, list of 7-bit character sets since 1967
 ISO/IEC 8859, list of 8-bit character sets since 1987
 ISO/IEC 10646, a 32-bit character set since 1990

It may also refer to:

 ISO basic Latin alphabet
 ISO/IEC 2022
 ISO 2033
 ISO 2047
 ISO 5426
 ISO 5427
 ISO 5428
 ISO 6438